UPTI Affair was a criminal case against a number of scholars of the Ukrainian Physics and Technology Institute in Kharkov, Soviet Ukraine, by the GUGB during 1938, a part of the Great Purge.

As a result, the UFTI leaders, including a Soviet experimental physicist Lev Shubnikov, were arrested and executed during this crisis. In the response to the state of affairs, the Soviet physicists Moisey Korets and Lev Landau, wrote the leaflet which directly condemned Joseph Stalin and the secret police NKVD.

References 

 Yu.V. Pavlenko, Yu.A. Ranyuk, and Yu.A. Khramov (1998), «Delo» UFTI 1935–1938 (The UPTI ‘Affair’ 1935–1938). Kiev: Feniks.
Copy of the original text of Korets-Landau leaflet (in Russian)

External links 
 Documents regarding cases of Shubnikov, Rozenkevich, Gorsky and Korets (in Russian)

Political repression in the Soviet Union
Science and technology in the Soviet Union
Kharkiv Institute of Physics and Technology
1938 in the Soviet Union